Once Upon a Time – Far Away in the South is an album by  Argentine bandoneón player and composer Dino Saluzzi recorded in 1985 and released on the ECM label.

Reception
The Allmusic review awarded the album 2 stars.

Track listing
All compositions by Dino Saluzzi except as indicated
 "Jose, Valeria and Matias" - 12:51 
 "And the Father Said... (Intermediate)" - 1:45 
 "The Revelation (Ritual)" - 5:17 
 "Silence" (Charlie Haden) - 6:49 
 "...And He Loved His Brother,Till the End" - 7:47 
 "Far Away in the South..." - 15:52 
 "We Are the Children" (Palle Mikkelborg) - 5:08
Recorded at Tonstudio Bauer in Ludwigsburg, West Germany in July 1985

Personnel
Dino Saluzzi — bandoneón 
Palle Mikkelborg — trumpet, fluegelhorn
Charlie Haden — bass
Pierre Favre — percussion

References

ECM Records albums
Dino Saluzzi albums
1986 albums
Albums produced by Manfred Eicher